A dolmen or portal tomb is a type of single-chamber megalithic tomb, usually consisting of two or more upright megaliths supporting a large flat horizontal capstone or "table". Most date from the early Neolithic period (40003000 BCE) and were sometimes covered with earth or smaller stones to form a tumulus (burial mound). Small pad-stones may be wedged between the cap and supporting stones to achieve a level appearance. In many instances, the covering has eroded away, leaving only the stone "skeleton".

The Korean Peninsula is home to the world's highest concentration of dolmens, including "cemeteries" consisting of 30–100 examples located in close proximity to each other; with over 35,000 dolmens, Korea alone (for unknown reasons) accounts for approximately 40% of the global total.

History
It remains unclear when, why and by whom the earliest dolmens were made. The oldest known are found in Western Europe, dating from c. 7,000 years ago. Archaeologists still do not know who erected these dolmens, which makes it difficult to know why they did it. They are generally all regarded as tombs or burial chambers, despite the absence of clear evidence for this. Human remains, sometimes accompanied by artefacts, have been found in or close to the dolmens which could be scientifically dated using radiocarbon dating. However, it has been impossible to prove that these remains date from the time when the stones were originally set in place.

The word dolmen entered archaeology when Théophile Corret de la Tour d'Auvergne used it to describe megalithic tombs in his  (1796) using the spelling dolmin (the current spelling was introduced about a decade later and had become standard in French by about 1885). The Oxford English Dictionary does not mention dolmin in English and gives its first citation for dolmen from a book on Brittany in 1859, describing the word as "The French term, used by some English authors, for a cromlech ...". The name was supposedly derived from a Breton language term meaning 'stone table' but doubt has been cast on this, and the OED describes its origin as "Modern French". Nonetheless it has now replaced cromlech as the usual English term in archaeology, when the more technical and descriptive alternatives are not used. The later Cornish term was quoit – an English-language word for an object with a hole through the middle preserving the original Cornish language term of  – the name of another dolmen-like monument is in fact Mên-an-Tol 'stone with hole' (Standard Written Form: Men An Toll.)

Granja is used in Portugal, Galicia, and some parts of Spain. The rarer forms anta and ganda also appear. In the Basque Country, they are attributed to the jentilak, a race of giants.

Of other Celtic languages, Welsh  was borrowed into English and quoit is commonly used in English in Cornwall.

Types

See also 

 Antequera Dolmens Site
 Gochang, Hwasun and Ganghwa Dolmen Sites
 Irish megalithic tombs
 Kistvaen
 List of Dolmens
 List of megalithic sites
 Megalithic art
 Neolithic Europe
 Nordic megalith architecture
 Rujm el-Hiri
 Taula

References

Sources

Further reading 
 .

External links 

 World heritage site of dolmen in Korea
 Piccolo, Salvatore. "Dolmen." World History Encyclopedia.
 The Megalith Map
 The Megalithic Portal and Megalith Map
  Dolmen Museum in Italian and English
 Goindol: Dolmen of Korea
 Research Centre of Dolmens in Northeast Asia
 Poulnabrone Dolmen in the Burren, County Clare, Ireland
  on UNESCO's World Heritage List.
 Jersey Heritage Trust
 Dolmen Pictures by Robert Triest.
 Dolmens of Russia
 Dolmens. Part 2. How and for which purpose were they built? Hypotheses

 
Burial monuments and structures
Megalithic monuments
Types of monuments and memorials
Stone monuments and memorials
Stones
Death customs
Megalithic monuments in the Middle East
Stone Age Europe